4-1-1 is a telephone number for local directory assistance in Canada and the United States. Until the early 1980s, 4-1-1 and the related 1-1-3 number were free to call in most states.

In the United States, the service is commonly known as “information” although it official name is “directory assistance”.  As a result, 4-1-1 is commonly used in Canada and the United States as a slang word for "information". In the 1982 song "Jump to It" by American singer Aretha Franklin, for example, the lyric is "We have a lot of fun, don't we, girl, dishin' out
The dirt on everybody and givin' each other the 411".

History
The 4-1-1 number has been used since at least 1930 in New York City, San Francisco, and other large cities where panel and crossbar switching equipment installed by the Bell System was prevalent. However, in smaller Bell System cities as well as almost all areas served by GTE and other companies where step-by-step equipment was the norm such as Los Angeles, 1-1-3 was used until at least the 1960s, and in some cases (the Pacific Northwest, for example) until the mid-1980s.

In Canada and the United States, directory assistance was historically a local function, and most companies updated listings at their directory assistance centers frequently, sometimes daily. When long-distance numbers were needed, prior to the full introduction of direct-dialed long-distance service, callers would call either 4-1-1 or "0" (Operator) and request a free long-distance connection to the directory assistance center in the distant city.

In 1962, direct-dialed long-distance directory assistance became available. The number in cities with panel and crossbar switching equipment was area code-555-1212, whereas in cities with step-by-step equipment the number was 1-555-1212 (or 112-555-1212) for numbers not local but in the same area code and 1-area code-555-1212 (or 112-area code-555-1212) for numbers in other area codes. In some area codes, the directory assistance center was able to serve the entire area code, but in many, the operator in the principal city of the area code dialed would connect the caller onward to a more local directory assistance center for the most up-to-date information.

After the introduction of local exchange competition, most telephone companies outsourced directory assistance service to nationwide call centers. This has blurred the distinction between 4-1-1 and 555-1212. For regulatory reasons, where telephone service is provided by traditional local-exchange carriers, the local carrier will determine how to handle 411, the chosen local toll (intra-LATA) carrier will determine how to handle 555-1212 calls for area codes within the LATA, and the chosen long-distance carrier for inter-LATA) calls will determine how to handle other area code-555-1212 calls. For service provided by cellular and VoIP carriers where the customer does not have a choice of local toll or long-distance carriers, all calls may be handled the same way.

In North America, all areas formerly using 1-1-3 have been converted to using 4-1-1, and 1-1- is now reserved for vertical service codes. Outside North America, "1-1-N" numbers are still in use, for these and other services. In most European countries, "1-1-N" numbers are related to emergency services and 112 is the emergency telephone number for countries in the European Union as well as some other European countries.

The relationship between 4-1-1, 1-1-3, and long-distance dialing
Direct-distance dialing (DDD) was first introduced in areas with common-control switching (panel and crossbar) in the 1950s. These areas had used 4-1-1 for directory assistance, and because of the ability of common-control switching to analyze the initial digits of a number in a "sender" before routing the call, these areas did not require the dialing of an initial "1" to initiate a long-distance call. There was no ambiguity, because the initial assignment of area codes always used either a "0" or a "1" as the second digit, and the second digit of local numbers was never a "0" or a "1" because of the use of two-letter plus 5-digit local numbering, with the letters only on digits 2-9 of the dial.

Areas with step-by-step equipment processed the call one digit at a time as dialed by the caller, and thus needed a common prefix to distinguish long-distance dialing from local calls. The Bell System design choice was "1", but since "1-1-3" was in use for directory assistance, along with other "1-1-" codes ("Repair" was 1-1-4)., changes had to be made in the step-by-step areas. Initially, "1-1-2" was used temporarily as the prefix in most of these areas. To simplify long-distance calling, it was desirable to change this to a "1". Some areas converted immediately to 4-1-1 for directory assistance and 6-1-1 for repair. Other areas retained 1-1-3 by installing what were known as "double-header" trunks, which actually connected the call to the long-distance equipment and then "snatched it back" if the second digit was also a "1".

The conversion proceeded as follows in Springfield, Massachusetts:

Directory assistance data
The services of directory assistance queries is often outsourced to a call centre who specializes in that function. Historically, when a single carrier provided most of the telephone services for a region, the data used to satisfy the search could exclusively come for that carrier's subscriber rolls. Today, when the market is fragmented amongst many carriers, the data must be aggregated by a data aggregator specializing in directory listings, such as LSSi. The data aggregator distributes the data to the 4-1-1 services either on a "live" basis, actually servicing each query, or by periodically transferring large swaths of listings to the call center's systems for local searching.

The data aggregator collects the data from the rolls of many telecommunication carriers. Some carriers such as Vonage do not send their customer rolls to the aggregator. Their customers can get their listings in the directory assistance database using a free service such as ListYourself.net.

Landline telephone directory assistance
4-1-1 landline service has been historically provided by local telephone companies, including those of the former Bell System or subsequent Regional Bell Operating Companies (RBOCs). Telephone carriers since that time may provide the 4-1-1 calls to the customer free of charge and [use ad supported or a customer retention model][meaning unknown]

Since the 1984 Bell System divestiture, the RBOCs in the United States have priced 4-1-1 use higher to an average of US$1.25 per call, compared to $0.50 CAD in most of Canada, providing opportunities for competing services in the United States, such as ad-sponsored 1-800-FREE-411.

Wireless telephone directory listings 
In addition to the local and long-distance directory services, there is also a "Wireless 411 Service". As specified by the industry, the service will give wireless subscribers the choice of including their wireless phone numbers in directory assistance services.

Consumers can opt in to listing their name and cellphone number with directory assistance services, such as 411. The information is currently not published in print or online directories.  Additionally, the information is not added to, or otherwise shared with, marketing lists or telemarketing firms.

The service will allow any landline or wireless phone user to call 4-1-1 and be connected to the wireless listing of a subscriber who has chosen to participate in the service. Carriers who make up the industry LLC creating the service include Alltel (now absorbed by Verizon Wireless), AT&T, T-Mobile, and Sprint Nextel (now absorbed by T-Mobile).

Withdrawal of 4-1-1 services
In the United States cellular market, AT&T announced its withdrawal of 4-1-1 service for its wireless phone customers, effective November 1, 2022.  AT&T also announced it will discontinue landline 4-1-1 services in 21 states starting January 1, 2023.

See also
 9-1-1
 800-The-Info
 Bing 411
 GOOG-411
 Speech recognition
 Tellme Networks
  N11 Code

References

Further reading 
 2006 survey from Tellme Networks, Inc. about 411 usage
 The Kelsey Group report on wireless voice search (10/2006)

Directory assistance services
Three-digit telephone numbers